Jeff Mitchell (born May 16, 1975) is an American former professional ice hockey right winger who played seven games in the National Hockey League (NHL) for the Dallas Stars. As a youth, he played in the 1989 Quebec International Pee-Wee Hockey Tournament with the Detroit Little Caesars minor ice hockey team.

Career statistics

References

External links

1975 births
American men's ice hockey right wingers
Cincinnati Cyclones (IHL) players
Cincinnati Mighty Ducks players
Dallas Stars players
Dayton Bombers players
Detroit Junior Red Wings players
Ice hockey players from Michigan
Kalamazoo Wings (1974–2000) players
Living people
Los Angeles Kings draft picks
People from Wayne, Michigan
Philadelphia Phantoms players
Saint John Flames players
Toledo Storm players